Nancy L. Pedersen is an American genetic epidemiologist. She is Professor of Genetic Epidemiology and the leader of the Swedish Adoption/Twin Study of Aging (SATSA) at the Karolinska Institutet in Stockholm, Sweden. She is known for her research on human twins, much of which is based on the Swedish Twin Registry. This has included research on the genetic basis of Alzheimer's disease and self-confidence.

Education
After graduating from Brainerd High School in Brainerd, Minnesota, Pedersen received her B.A. degree in psychology from the University of Minnesota in 1974, where she graduated magna cum laude. She went on to earn her M.A. and Ph.D. degrees in psychology and behavioral genetics from the University of Colorado in 1977 and 1980, respectively.

Honors and awards
Pedersen was elected a fellow of the Gerontological Society of America in 2002. In 2007, she received the James Shields Award for Lifetime Contributions to Twin Research from the International Society for Twin Studies. In 2014, she received the Dobzhansky Award from the Behavior Genetics Association. She was named an ISI Highly Cited Researcher in 2018.

References

External links
Faculty page

Living people
American women epidemiologists
American epidemiologists
American geneticists
Genetic epidemiologists
Academic staff of the Karolinska Institute
Fellows of the Gerontological Society of America
People from Brainerd, Minnesota
University of Minnesota College of Liberal Arts alumni
University of Colorado alumni
Year of birth missing (living people)
American women geneticists
21st-century American women